Walnut Hill Presbyterian Church is a historic Presbyterian church meeting house in Lexington, Kentucky.  The church building was constructed in 1801 on land donated by Mary Todd Lincoln's grandfather Levi Todd.

It replaced a log meetinghouse which had been built in 1785.  It is a stone  structure which had two rows of square windows.  It was renovated in 1880;  the renovation replaced the square windows by Gothic shaped ones.  Stone front steps were donated in 1900.

The building was added to the National Register of Historic Places in 1973.

References

External links
 Walnut Hill Presbyterian website

Presbyterian churches in Kentucky
National Register of Historic Places in Lexington, Kentucky
Churches completed in 1801
19th-century Presbyterian church buildings in the United States
Churches in Lexington, Kentucky
1801 establishments in Kentucky
Gothic Revival church buildings in Kentucky
Lincoln family